The Trieste National Hall or Slovene Cultural Centre, also known as the Hotel Balkan, in Trieste was a multimodal building that served as a centre for the Slovene minority in the city. It included the Slovene theatre in Trieste, a hotel and numerous cultural associations. It is notable for having been burned in 1920 by Italian Fascists, which made it a symbol of the Italian repression of the Slovene minority in Italy. The building was restored from 1988 to 1990.

Building

Such institutions were typical in Slovenian ethnic territory in the decades around 1900. It was designed by the Slovenian architect Maks Fabiani in 1902. Fabiani designed the building with the concept of technical-rational structure, with the facade of monumental stone. It was completed in 1904. It had an ornate facade and state-of-the-art equipment, including an electric generator and central heating.

Fascist attack
On 13 July 1920, as a reaction to the July 11 Split incident, the building was burned by the Fascist Blackshirts, led by Francesco Giunta. The act was praised by Benito Mussolini, who had not yet assumed power, as a "masterpiece of the Triestine Fascism". It was part of a wider pogrom against the Slovenes and other Slavs in the very centre of Trieste and the harbinger of the ensuing violence against the Slovenes and Croats in the Julian March.

On 15 May 1921, less than a year after the arson attack, the architect Fabiani became a member of the Italian Fascist movement. The reason for his joining the party and his political activity in the following years remains unclear.

Legacy

Boris Pahor's autobiographical novel Trg Oberdan describes how he witnessed the Fascists burning the building.

Further reading
 Kacin Wohinz, Milica (2010): Alle origini del fascismo di confine – Gli sloveni della Venezia Giulia sotto l'occupazione italiana 1918–1921, Gorica, p. 307

Notes

References

Buildings and structures in Trieste
Max Fabiani buildings
History of Trieste
History of Slovenes in Italy
1920 in Italy
Italian Fascism
Buildings and structures completed in 1904
Hotels in Trieste
Slovene national halls
Buildings and structures destroyed by arson
Art Nouveau architecture in Italy
Anti-Slovene sentiment
20th-century architecture in Italy